About the Boy Who Plays the Tin Drum is the thirteenth studio album by Latvian band Brainstorm. It was produced by Povel Olson and David Larsson, and was released on 25 April 2018 by Prāta Vētras skaņu ierakstu kompānija. English and Russian language versions with different track listings were released later in the year. Upon release, the album received mixed reviews by the Latvian media.

Background and recording 
The lyrics and music for the album' songs were written by the band as a whole as opposed to any particular member. The album's title is a reference to German writer Günter Grass' book Tin Drum, about the boy Oskar Matzerath, who distances himself from the horror of World War II. The album was recorded in three places: Rīga, Ikšķile and Stockholm, and was produced by Swedish producers Povel Olson and David Larsson. As customary for the band, the album's songs were recorded in three different versions: Latvian, Russian and English.

Release 
The Latvian version of the album, Par to zēnu, kas sit skārda bungas, was released on April 25, 2018. One month later on May 25, the band released the English version, About the Boy Who Plays the Tin Drum, with lyrics of most songs translated into English as well as a different track order and without the Latvian version's title track. A third version, Wonderful Day, was released in Moscow on December 13.

Reception 
The album received mixed reviews by the Latvian media. Kaspars Zaviļevskis of Delfi described the album as balladic and romantic, calling it a candidate for the best pop album of 2018.

On the other hand, Sandris Vanzovičs from Neatkarīgā Rīta Avīze wrote it was the worst of their albums, claiming that other than “”Par to zēnu, kas sist skārda bungas”, “Tevis dēļ” and “Pašu dārgāko," the rest was "a mix of Eurovision, ABBA-esque pop hits, Latvian 80s music and unnecessary experiments." Jānis Žilde wrote for TVNET that the album sounded like “four men doing their jobs,” calling the music "popcorn rock" that didn't differentiate itself from other music on the radio.

Track listing

Par to zēnu, kas sit skārda bungas (Latvian version)

Wonderful Day (Russian Version)

About the Boy Who Plays the Tin Drum (English Version)

References 

2018 albums
Brainstorm (Latvian band) albums